The 2015 WCHA Men's Ice Hockey Tournament was played between March 13 and March 21, 2015, at four conference arenas and the Xcel Energy Center in St. Paul, Minnesota. By winning the tournament, Minnesota State was awarded the Broadmoor Trophy and received the WCHA's automatic bid to the 2015 NCAA Division I Men's Ice Hockey Tournament.

Format
The first round of the postseason tournament features a best-of-three games format. The top eight or ten conference teams participate in the tournament. Teams are seeded No. 1 through No. 8 according to their final conference standing, with a tiebreaker system used to seed teams with an identical number of points accumulated. The top four seeded teams each earn home ice and host one of the lower seeded teams.

The winners of the first round series advance to the Xcel Energy Center for the WCHA Final Five, a holdover from previous tournaments where it was used as the collective name of the quarterfinal, semifinal, and championship rounds. The Final Five uses a single-elimination format. Teams are re-seeded No. 1 through No. 4 according to the final regular season conference standings.

Conference standings
Note: GP = Games played; W = Wins; L = Losses; T = Ties; PTS = Points; GF = Goals For; GA = Goals Against

Bracket
Teams are reseeded after the first round

Note: * denotes overtime periods

Results

First round
All times are local.

(1) Minnesota State vs. (8) Lake Superior State

(2) Michigan Tech vs. (7) Alabama–Huntsville

(3) Bowling Green vs. (6) Northern Michigan

(4) Bemidji State vs. (5) Ferris State

Semifinals
All times are local (UTC−5).

(3) Bowling Green  vs. (2) Michigan Tech

(5) Ferris State vs. (1) Minnesota State

Championship
All times are local (UTC−5).

(2) Michigan Tech vs. (1) Minnesota State

Tournament awards

All-Tournament Team
F Tyler Heinonen, So. (Michigan Tech)
F David Johnstone, Sr. (Michigan Tech)
F Brad McClure*, Fr. (Minnesota State)
D Zach Palmquist, Sr. (Minnesota State)
D Brett Stern, Sr. (Minnesota State)
G Stephon Williams, Jr. (Minnesota State)
* Most Valuable Player

References

External links
Western Collegiate Hockey Association

WCHA Men's Ice Hockey Tournament
WCHA Men's Ice Hockey Tournament
Ice hockey in Minnesota
College sports in Minnesota
WCHA Men's Ice Hockey Tournament